Arthur Baker may refer to:
 Arthur Baker (calligrapher), American calligrapher and typeface designer
 Arthur Baker (musician) (born 1955), American record producer and DJ
 Arthur Slade Baker (1863–1943), British Army officer
 Arthur Baker, character in The Long Walk

See also
Art Baker (disambiguation)